The 12th Presidium of the Supreme People's Assembly (SPA) was elected by the 1st Session of the 12th Supreme People's Assembly on 9 April 2009. It was replaced on 9 April 2014 by the 13th SPA Presidium.

Officers

President

Vice president

Honorary Vice President

Secretary-General

Members

Add-ons

References

Citations

Bibliography
Books:
 

12th Supreme People's Assembly
Presidium of the Supreme People's Assembly
2009 establishments in North Korea
2014 disestablishments in North Korea